Flemington Racecourse railway station is located on the Flemington Racecourse line in Victoria, Australia. It serves Flemington Racecourse in the suburb of Flemington opening on 28 February 1861.

The station is only open on race days and during special events at Flemington Racecourse.

Platforms and services
Flemington Racecourse has two side platforms. During special events, it is serviced by trains to Flinders Street calling at North Melbourne and Southern Cross. Two sidings between the platforms are used to stable trains.

During construction work on the Regional Rail Link, the station has been opened on occasions with Sunbury line services diverted.

In 2018, when the level crossing was being removed at Essendon Station, Racecourse station was used for commuters on the Craigieburn Line.

Platforms 1 & 2:
 limited stop services to Southern Cross and/or Flinders Street (special event days only)

References

External links

 Melway map at street-directory.com.au

Railway stations in Melbourne
Railway stations in Australia opened in 1861
Flemington, Victoria
Railway stations in the City of Melbourne (LGA)